Perdrix was a corvette of the French Royal Navy, launched in 1784. The British captured her off Antigua in 1795 and she served briefly in the Royal Navy in the West Indies, where she captured a French privateer, before being broken up in 1798.

French service and capture
In April 1786 Perdrix was holed by a rock when she arrived at Tobago. She was refloated and repaired there between April and July.

Between 14 February and 2 May 1791, Perdrix was under the command of Lieutenant de vaisseaux Duval-Paris. He sailed her from Brest to Cadiz, and then on to Martinique and Cap-Français, carrying payroll. In December 1792 she sailed to the assistance of the frigate Didon, which had foundered before Pointe-à-Pitre. From there Perdrix returned to Fort-Royal. She then sailed back to France, sailing from Rochefort to Brest, via La Corogne. On 4 December 1792 sous-lieutenant de vaisseaux Krohm took command, with Duval-Paris being promoted to capitaine de vaisseau the next day. 

Perdrix cruised to the south of Belle Île, then was at Rochefort, before cruising along the coasts of la Vendée. Next she sailed from Rochefort to Mindin (Opposite to Saint-Nazaire). Lastly, she sailed on a mission to 
Saint-Pierre-et-Miquelon. During this period she had several commanders. From 26 February to 24 April 1793 her commander was capitaine de vaisseau Renaudin. His successor was enseigne de vaisseau non entretenu Garreau (temporarily until 20 May 1793), and nominally between 26 February and 22 July, lieutenant de vaisseau Barré, though Barré may not have assumed command until 14 May.

Barré, who continued in command until 28 November 1794, sailed Perdrix from Paimbœuf to Nova Scotia and then to New York. He was on the United States station, where he convoyed vessels from Sandy Hook to Cape Henlopen and into the Atlantic. In June 1794, Perdrix was perhaps temporarily under the command of Lieutenant de vaiseaux Le Bouteiller. 

On his way back, on 5 June he captured Perdrix, a "French Ship of War of 24 Guns." She was under the command of Lieutenant de vaisseau Le Bouteiller.

British service
The British commissioned Perdrix on 2 February 1796 under the command of Captain William Charles Fahie. At some point between 18 March 1797 and 30 May, Perdrix recaptured the sloop General,  H. Bloombury, Master, from Barbados. She had been sailing to Martinique with a cargo of dry goods and provisions. Perdrix recaptured her off Guadaloupe and sent her to Fort Royal, Martinique.

On 13 January 1798, while Fahie was on leave to take temporary command of the fleet, then anchored before St. Kitts, Lieutenant Charles Peterson was in command of Perdrix. A dispute arose between the two lieutenants over who was senior and so in charge of the port and both vessels. In the dispute, Camelford shot and killed Peterson for mutiny. Peterson had been first lieutenant under Camelford for three months when Camelford had taken over Favourite, even though Peterson was senior on the lieutenants list and represented Captain Fahie. The two ships' companies almost fired on each other when Camelford shot Petersen. Captain Henry Mitford of  arrived that evening and put Camelford under arrest. Mitford put Lieutenant Parsons of Favourite in command of Perdrix and sent her out to sea. The subsequent court martial acquitted Camelford.

Perdrix engaged in one major action when on 12 December 1798 she took L'Armée d' Italie, a privateer of fourteen 9-pounder and four 12-pounder guns. A few days earlier Perdrix had encountered an American vessel leeward of St Thomas, which had reported being boarded by a French privateer seven leagues east of Virgin Gorda. The wind and weather were such that it took four days before Fahie could get Perdrix to the area and find his quarry.

After a chase of 16 hours and an action of 42 minutes, the privateer was an unmanageable wreck. Of her crew of 117 men under the command of Citizen Colachyshe had lost six dead and five wounded; Perdrix had only one man wounded, and some damage to her sails and rigging. L'Armee d' Italie was 11 days out of Guadeloupe and had captured the brig Bittern and the schooner Concorde, out of Martinique. (Some members of their crews were aboard L'Armee d' Italie when Perdrix captured her. Perdrix then took her into Tortola, where she was condemned a week later.

At some point Perdrix captured Remt Folkerus.

Fate
Perdrix arrived at Deptford on 22 July 1799. She was broken up on 10 September, less than two months after arriving.

Notes, citations, and references

Notes

Citations

References
 
 Fonds Marine. Campagnes (opérations ; divisions et stations navales ; missions diverses). Inventaire de la sous-série Marine BB4. Tome premier : BB4 1 à 209 (1790-1804) 
 
  
 

1784 ships
Ships built in France
Captured ships
Post ships of the Royal Navy